Mark Henderson may refer to:
 Mark Henderson (lighting designer) (born 1957), Broadway lighting designer
 Mark Henderson (swimmer) (born 1969), American swimmer
 The snowplow driver during the 1982 NFL game between New England Patriots and the Miami Dolphins; see Snowplow Game